Concrete Jungle is an album by saxophonist David "Fathead" Newman recorded in 1977 and released on the Prestige label.

Reception

In his review for AllMusic, Scott Yanow stated: A versatile performer, David "Fathead" Newman has appeared through the years in both straight-ahead and commercial settings. This LP is definitely in the latter category. Newman, who splits his time here almost equally between alto, soprano, tenor and flute, is accompanied by an electronic rhythm section ... The music was instantly dated, overproduced, and not up to Newman's usual level".

Track listing 
 "Knocks Me Off My Feet" (Stevie Wonder) – 4:04
 "Save Your Love for Me" (Buddy Johnson) – 5:21
 "Blues for Ball" (McCoy Tyner) – 5:21
 "Dance of the Honey Bee and the Funky Fly" (William Fischer) – 6:19
 "Concrete Jungle" (Bob Marley) – 7:30 
 "Sun Seeds" (David "Fathead" Newman) – 5:18
 "Distant Lover" (Marvin Gaye, Gwen Gordy Fuqua, Sandra Greene) – 7:31

Personnel 
David "Fathead" Newman – tenor saxophone, alto saxophone, soprano saxophone, flute
Pat Rebillot – keyboards
Jay Graydon – electric guitar
Abraham Laboriel – electric bass
Idris Muhammad – drums
Bill Summers – congas, percussion
Jimmy Owens, Milt Ward – trumpet (tracks 1-3, 5 & 7)
Earl McIntyre – trombone (tracks 1-3, 5 & 7)
Kenneth Harris – flute (tracks 1-3, 5 & 7)
Babe Clark – tenor saxophone (tracks 1-3, 5 & 7)
Clarence Thomas – baritone saxophone (tracks 1-3, 5 & 7)
String section: (tracks 1, 2, 4 & 7)
Gene Orloff, Harry Lookofsky, Kathryn Kienke, Regis Iandiorio, Sanford Allen, Yoko Matsuo, Stan Pollock, Anthony Posk  – violin
Alfred Brown, Linda Lawrence – viola
Kermit Moore – cello
William Fischer – arranger, conductor

References 

David "Fathead" Newman albums
1978 albums
Prestige Records albums
Albums produced by Orrin Keepnews
Albums arranged by William S. Fischer
Albums conducted by William S. Fischer